The SWAC men's basketball tournament (popularly known as the SWAC Tournament) is the conference championship tournament in basketball for the Southwestern Athletic Conference (SWAC). The tournament has been held every year since 1978. It is a single-elimination tournament and seeding is based on regular season records. The winner, declared conference champion, receives the conference's automatic bid to the NCAA men's basketball tournament. The tournament has been held every year since 1982, the MAAC's first season. It is a single-elimination tournament and seeding is based on regular season records. The winner, declared conference champion, receives the conference's automatic bid to the NCAA Division I men's basketball tournament.

The 1977–78 season was the SWAC's first as an NCAA Division I basketball conference.

The semi-final and championship SWAC Basketball Tournament games are held at the Bill Harris Arena in Birmingham, Alabama. As of the 2017 tournaments, they feature an eight-team three-day layout with the quarterfinal rounds hosted on campus sites. This changes the previous 10-team, five-day tournament format. The higher seeded teams will host a combined eight games leaving two days for travel and practice rounds. The tournament concludes with the semi-finals and championship rounds inside Birmingham's Bill Harris Arena.  Winners of the tournaments earn automatic bids to their respective NCAA Division I Tournaments. The championship games are nationally televised live annually on an ESPN network.

List of champions

Men's basketball tournament performance by school

References

 
Recurring sporting events established in 1977